Toney Penna is a proposed Tri-Rail Coastal Link Green Line station in Jupiter, Florida. The station is planned for construction west of Dixie Highway (Broward–Palm Beach) (Florida State Road 811) between Toney Penna Drive and Jupiter Lakes Boulevard.

References

External links
 Proposed site in Google Maps Street View

Jupiter, Florida
Tri-Rail stations in Palm Beach County, Florida
Proposed Tri-Rail stations